Aaj Tak is an Indian Hindi-language news channel owned by TV Today Network, part of the New Delhibased media conglomerate Living Media group (India Today Group)

Aaj Tak  HD 
On 14 December 2018, Aaj Tak launched India's first Hindi high-definition channel, Aaj Tak HD.  Aaj Tak HD broadcasts news and two extra shows like Duniya Aaj Tak aired from 2019 covering world news, Business Aaj Tak aired from 2019 covering the financial news of India & Worldwide. Aaj Tak HD also broadcast Movie Masala aired between 2019 and 2020 covering the news of Bollywood.

History
Aaj Tak was first broadcast on DD Metro of Doordarshan (DD) in the year 1995. This was then broadcast as a news program of 10 to 20 minutes. Aaj Tak came into existence in December 2000 as an independent news channel and then it became the first complete Hindi news channel in the country to be broadcast twenty-four hours. One of the anchors at the time was Surendra Pratap Singh. The tagline for Aaj Tak was "". Aaj Tak was the first news channel in India to use OB vans.

By the time the channel came into existence, it had a reach of 52 lakh households and since then it has become the channel to broadcast in three crore households and its viewership in news channels is 56%. On 14 December 2018, Aaj Tak launched India's first Hindi high-definition channel, Aaj Tak HD. A channel rebranding took place in January 2021.

Staff

Executive staff 
 Aroon Purie, chairman, India Today Group
 Anjana Om Kashyap  Executive Editor
 Sweta Singh  Executive Editor
 Sudhir Chaudhary  Consulting Editor

Past staff 
Past anchors have included Rohit Sardana and Surendra Pratap Singh. Uday Shankar has worked as a news director during the initial years of Aaj Tak.

 Prabhu Chawla
 Abhinandan Sekhri
 Punya Prasun Bajpai
 Boria Majumdar
 Ashutosh Rana

Reception
The channel has been penalized for propagation of fake news and condemned  for being partial and supporting the ideology of the ruling government.

In October 2020, Aaj Tak was fined ₹1 lakh and asked to broadcast apologies for fake news regarding Sushant Singh Rajput. The channel published fabricated last tweets by the actor on the channel, claiming that they were made by him a few days before his death and then deleted. Aaj Tak later removed its article with this fake news published in it.

Aaj Tak was fined ₹5 lakh by BARC (Broadcast Audience Research Council) for viewership manipulation in a TRP scam.

Between 4 and 5 April 2020, Aaj Tak had broadcast reports about Tablighi Jamaat. A complaint was filed with the News Broadcasting Standards Authority (NBSA) in which Aaj Tak was accused of intending to "develop hatred in the minds of the people against a particular community" during the COVID-19 pandemic in India. 

On 16 June 2021, the NBSA directed that Aaj Tak's broadcasts be taken down from all Internet platforms that linked a COVID-19 outbreak with Tablighi Jamaat in 2020, citing potential "errors in the figures telecast". 

The NBSA said that the media has "complete freedom to report on the Covid pandemic", but "such reporting must be done with accuracy, impartiality and neutrality", and added "NBSA noted that the broadcaster had admitted that there may have been chances that there were some miscalculations as pointed out by the complaint, which were inadvertent, and the broadcaster had no intention to communalize the issue or malign any community."

In June 2022, the National Broadcasting and Digital Standards Authority said that Aaj Tak's taglines on Umar Khalid ‘gave an impression that the accused had already been declared guilty’ and asked the news channel to take down those shows.

Accolades
According to an old 2006 poll jointly conducted by the BBC and Reuters, of specific news sources spontaneously mentioned by Indians, Aaj Tak (mentioned by 11%) was the most trusted.

Aaj Tak had won the award for "Best Hindi News Channel" 19 times since 2001 at the Indian Television Academy Awards.

See also
 Living Media
 India Today Television
 Good News Today
Dilli Aaj Tak

References

External links
 official website

24-hour television news channels in India
India Today Group
Hindi-language television channels in India
Hindi-language television stations
Television channels and stations established in 1999
1999 establishments in Uttar Pradesh